The 2016 Supercopa de España was a two-legged football match-up played in August 2016 between the champions of 2015–16 La Liga and 2015–16 Copa del Rey, Barcelona, and the runners-up of the 2015–16 Copa del Rey, Sevilla, making it a rematch of the 2016 Copa del Rey Final.

Match details
All times are local (UTC+2).

First leg
The opening goal of the match came in the 54th minute when Denis Suárez chipped the ball into the penalty area for Arda Turan to chest back into the path of Luis Suárez, who finished with a low, right-footed bouncing shot from ten yards out. Munir scored the second in the 81st minute with a left-footed strike from the top of the penalty area following a low pass from Lionel Messi.

Second leg
Arda Turan opened the scoring in the 10th minute with a low shot into the bottom right corner from six yards out after a pass from Messi. At the half-hour mark, Claudio Bravo saved a penalty from Vicente Iborra after Samuel Umtiti had blocked a shot that was ruled a handball. A minute before halftime, Sevilla almost got their first goal of the series with Gabriel Mercado's header hitting the crossbar. Turan then got his second one minute into the second half with a lobbed right foot finish from outside the penalty area.		
Barcelona's third goal came in the 55th minute with a header scored by Messi after a cross from the left by Lucas Digne.

References

2016–17 in Spanish football cups
FC Barcelona matches
Sevilla FC matches
2016
August 2016 sports events in Spain